Kröslin is a municipality in the Vorpommern-Greifswald district, in Mecklenburg-Vorpommern, Germany. It consists of the villages
Freest
Hollendorf
Karrin
Kröslin
Spandowerhagen
and the islands
Greifswalder Oie
Ruden
Dänholm
Großer Wotig
Kleiner Wotig
Großer Rohrplan.

References

External links

Vorpommern-Greifswald